Ju-jitsu, for the 2013 World Combat Games, was held at the Yubileiny - Sports Complex 'Yubileiny' Hall 2, in Saint Petersburg, Russia. Competitions took place on the 24 and 25 October 2013.

Medal table
Key:

Medal summary

Men

Women

Mixed

References

Jujutsu
2013 World Combat Games events